Dudley Phillips (7 April 1905 – 7 February 1953) was a South African cricketer. He played in five first-class matches for Border from 1924/25 to 1930/31.

See also
 List of Border representative cricketers

References

External links
 

1905 births
1953 deaths
South African cricketers
Border cricketers